Ocybadistes is a genus of skippers in the family Hesperiidae.

Species
The genus includes the following species:

 Ocybadistes flavovittata (Latreille, [1824])
 Ocybadistes walkeri Heron, 1894
 Ocybadistes knightorum Lambkin & Donaldson, 1994
 Ocybadistes ardea Bethune-Baker, 1906
 Ocybadistes hypomeloma Lower, 1911
 Ocybadistes papua Evans, 1934
 Ocybadistes zelda Parsons, 1986

References
 Natural History Museum Lepidoptera genus database
 Ocybadistes at funet

Taractrocerini
Hesperiidae genera